Ectopria is a genus of water penny beetles in the family Psephenidae. There are about nine described species in Ectopria.

Species
These species belong to the genus Ectopria:
 Ectopria hsui Lee & Yang, 1994
 Ectopria laticollis Wickham, 1913
 Ectopria leechi Brigham, 1981
 Ectopria nervosa (Melsheimer, 1845)
 Ectopria opaca (Kiesenwetter, 1874)
 Ectopria reticulata Champion, 1897
 Ectopria tachikawai (Satô, 1968)
 Ectopria vermiculata Champion, 1897

References

Further reading

 
 
 

Byrrhoidea
Articles created by Qbugbot